San Javier River may refer to one of two rivers in Argentina:
 San Javier River (Santa Fe), an arm of the Paraná River
 San Javier River (Tucumán)